EXperience112 (styled "eXperience112" and renamed The Experiment in North America, New Zealand and Australia) is an adventure game created by French studio Lexis Numérique, and published by Micro Application in 2007 for the Microsoft Windows platform. In the game, the player does not directly control the avatar; instead, the player helps to guide the avatar via a system of cameras and remotely controlled equipment as a person who is sitting in front of a computer.

Gameplay
With the use of a sophisticated security system the player helps the main character, Lea Nichols by telling her where to go, by turning lights on and off, opening doors, entering codes, controlling helper robots, and reading the torrent of files, email, and codes you are given. Not all the e-mail contain helpful information, neither are all the cameras useful, some having fallen objects obscure the view or being otherwise non-functional. The game keeps a log of real world play time with Lea noting how many days long you've kept her waiting since last playing.

Plot
The setting is a derelict ship stranded on a beach in the middle of the ocean. The player, an anonymous person, is mysteriously locked in the operations room with doctor Lea Nichols, the only survivor of said ship.

The player first finds Lea Nichols through the camera lens when she wakes up from her room. After a brief introduction, she is reluctant to trust the player with valuable information (such as the login details to her computer account). However, since the player is the only person still alive beside her, she has to rely on them for her survival. During exploration with Nichols on the ship, she finds the remains of her old colleagues and occasionally, recollects some memory fragments of an experiment subject called "112".

Development and release

Outside of Europe, the game was released in February 2008 by The Adventure Company. In North America, Lea's appearance on the box art was changed considerably, but her in-game appearance was unaltered.

Reception

EXperience112 was met with mixed or average reviews. GamingShogun called the game a "very rewarding and challenging adventure/puzzle game which manages to create a hodgepodge of voyeurism, lateral thinking, and atmosphere that will surely give you the willies if played by yourself in a dark room".  Brett Todd of GameSpot said that the title "overcomes its clichéd beginnings with original gameplay."
Hyper said the "videogame postmodernism" style of voyeuristic play creates, "a truly bizarre feeling...rather than working against it, it contributes to its success."

See also
Lifeline
République

References

2007 video games
Adventure games
Lua (programming language)-scripted video games
Science fiction video games
Single-player video games
The Adventure Company games
Video games developed in France
Video games featuring female protagonists
Video games featuring non-playable protagonists
Windows games
Windows-only games
Lexis Numérique games